Once Bitten is a 1932 British comedy film directed by Leslie S. Hiscott and starring Richard Cooper, Ursula Jeans and Frank Pettingell. It was made at Twickenham Studios as a quota quickie.

Cast
 Ursula Jeans as Clare  
 Richard Cooper as Toby Galloway  
 Frank Pettingell as Sir Timothy Blott  
 Jeanne Stuart as Alicia 
 Dino Galvani as Mario Fideli  
 Sydney King as Jerry  
 Anthony Holles as Legros  
 Kathleen Kelly as Anne

References

Bibliography
 Chibnall, Steve. Quota Quickies: The Birth of the British 'B' Film. British Film Institute, 2007.
 Low, Rachael. Filmmaking in 1930s Britain. George Allen & Unwin, 1985.
 Wood, Linda. British Films, 1927-1939. British Film Institute, 1986.

External links

1932 films
1932 comedy films
1930s English-language films
Films directed by Leslie S. Hiscott
British comedy films
Films shot at Twickenham Film Studios
Quota quickies
British black-and-white films
1930s British films